Wapekeka 2 is an Oji-Cree First Nation reserve in Kenora District, and is one of the reserves of the Wapekeka First Nation.

References

Oji-Cree reserves in Ontario
Communities in Kenora District